The 1921 German Ice Hockey Championship was the fifth season of the German Ice Hockey Championship, the national championship of Germany. Berliner Schlittschuhclub won the championship by defeating MTV Munchen 1879 in the final.

Final

References

External links
German ice hockey standings 1912-1932
Ger
German Ice Hockey Championship seasons